Mauricio Alejandro Tévez (born 31 July 1996) is an Argentine footballer who plays as a forward for Chacarita Juniors.

Club career 

Tévez is a youth exponent from Newell's Old Boys. He made his league debut at 10 August 2014 against Boca Juniors in a 0-1 away win. Tévez scored the only goal of the game.

References

1996 births
Living people
Argentine footballers
Argentine expatriate footballers
Footballers from Rosario, Santa Fe
Association football forwards
Argentine Primera División players
Paraguayan Primera División players
Primera Nacional players
Newell's Old Boys footballers
Instituto footballers
Defensa y Justicia footballers
AD Oliveirense players
Sportivo Luqueño players
Chacarita Juniors footballers
Argentine expatriate sportspeople in Portugal
Argentine expatriate sportspeople in Paraguay
Expatriate footballers in Portugal
Expatriate footballers in Paraguay